Burned or burnt may refer to:

 Anything which has undergone combustion
 Burned (image), quality of an image transformed with loss of detail in all portions lighter than some limit, and/or those darker than some limit
 Burnt (film), a 2015 drama film starring Bradley Cooper
 Burned (album), 1995 album by Electrafixion
 "Burned" (Arrow), an episode of Arrow
 "Burned" (CSI: Miami), an episode of CSI: Miami
 "Burned" (Justified), an episode of Justified
 "Burned" (The Twilight Zone), a 2003 episode of The Twilight Zone
 Burned (Hopkins novel), a 2005 novel by Ellen Hopkins
 Burned (Cast novel), a 2010 novel by P. C. Cast
 Burned (TV series), 2003 MTV television series
 "Burned", a song written by Neil Young on the eponymous Buffalo Springfield album
 "Burned", a song by Hilary Duff from Dignity, 2007
 "Burnt", a song by Spratleys Japs from Pony, 1999

See also 
Burning (disambiguation)
Burn (disambiguation)